Herman W. Keiser (October 7, 1914 – December 24, 2003) was an American professional golfer on the PGA Tour, best known for winning the Masters Tournament in 1946, his only major title.

Keiser was born and raised in Springfield, Missouri. Like most professional golfers of his generation, he earned a living primarily as a club professional. His first job was as the assistant golf professional at Portage Country Club in Akron, Ohio. He eventually became head professional at Firestone Country Club in Akron, Ohio. Keiser's serious demeanor earned him the nickname, The Missouri Mortician, among his fellow golfers.

In 1942, Keiser interrupted his career to join the U.S. Navy for three years during World War II. He served as a storekeeper aboard . Keiser was discharged in 1945 and returned to play on the PGA Tour. Despite the long layoff, he earned second-place finishes to Sam Snead at the Greater Greensboro Open, to Buck White at the Memphis Invitational, and twice to leading money winner Ben Hogan, at the Dallas Invitational and the Phoenix Open. However, he achieved golfing immortality at the 1946 Masters Tournament when he took the lead on the third hole and never looked back, defeating Hogan by one stroke to earn $2,500 in first prize money. Keiser described his Masters win as "the greatest thing that ever happened to me." He won two more PGA Tour events that season.

In 1947, Keiser was part of the American team that won the Ryder Cup. While the United States defeated Britain 11-1, Keiser's loss to Sam King (4 and 3) prevented the Americans from a clean sweep.

Keiser retired in the 1950s, having won five tournaments during his PGA career. His only top ten in a major was his victory at Augusta in 1946. He returned to live in Ohio, where he purchased a driving range. He died in Akron in 2003 from complications of Alzheimer's disease at the age of 89.

Professional wins

PGA Tour wins (5)
1942 (1) Miami Biltmore International Four-Ball (with Chandler Harper)
1946 (3) Masters Tournament, Knoxville Invitational, Richmond Open
1947 (1) Esmeralda Open

Major championship is shown in bold.

Other wins
this list is probably incomplete
1939 Iowa Open
1949 Ohio Open
1951 Ohio Open

Major championships

Wins (1)

Results timeline

Note: Keiser never played in The Open Championship.

NT = no tournament
WD = withdrew
DQ = disqualified
CUT = missed the half-way cut
R64, R32, R16, QF, SF = round in which player lost in PGA Championship match play
"T" indicates a tie for a place

Summary

Most consecutive cuts made – 14 (1940 PGA – 1949 PGA)
Longest streak of top-10s – 1 (twice)

References

External links

American male golfers
PGA Tour golfers
Ryder Cup competitors for the United States
Winners of men's major golf championships
Golfers from Missouri
Golfers from Ohio
United States Navy personnel of World War II
Sportspeople from Springfield, Missouri
Sportspeople from Akron, Ohio
Neurological disease deaths in Ohio
Deaths from Alzheimer's disease
1914 births
2003 deaths